Yury Shcherbakov (born 1925) was a Soviet athlete. He competed in the men's javelin throw at the 1952 Summer Olympics.

References

External links
 

1925 births
Year of death missing
Athletes (track and field) at the 1952 Summer Olympics
Soviet male javelin throwers
Olympic athletes of the Soviet Union